, better known by her nickname Sudanna, is a Japanese dancer, rapper, model, actress and fashion designer. She is a former member of the J-Pop groups E-girls, Happiness and SudannaYuzuYully.

As an actress, she appeared in several dramas such as the Tokai TV/Fuji TV series Asu no Hikari o Tsukame: 2013 Summer in 2013.

Early life 
Anna Suda was born on October 12, 1997, in Tokyo, Japan, to a Filipino mother and a Japanese father. She has one older brother and two younger sisters. She began practicing dancing at the age of 9 and started to attend the EXPG dance school in Tokyo in her first year of junior high school. The biggest musical influences during her childhood were Western music, J-Pop and K-Pop.

She speaks Japanese as well as Tagalog.

Career 
In 2011, she participated in the dance section of the VOCAL BATTLE AUDITION 3. Even though she was defeated during the training camp examination, she was able to become part of EGD (EXPG GIRLS DANCERS) from EXPG.

On March 8, 2012, it was announced that she would join E-girls as a new member alongside Kizu Reina, who was also part of EGD.

In January 2013. she made her acting debut on the drama Shinryo-chu -in the Room-. Sudanna played her first lead role in the TV series Ashita no Hikari wo Tsukame -2013 Summer- in the same year. On May 27, it was announced she would join Happiness as a new member and performer.

In 2017, Sudanna appeared on the cover of Nylon Japan's December issue, her first solo magazine cover in her career as a model.

On November 9, 2016, she was announced as a member and rapper of the E-girls sub-unit Sudannayuzuyully, marking the first time she would be using her vocals in a group.

On September 21, 2018, Sudanna announced she would collaborate with the Japanese fashion brand EVRIS on a clothing collection. The collaboration titled -SUDA ANNA×EVRIS- "SPECIAL COLLABORATION" was released on October 26 and included several pieces designed by herself. In November 2018, she was chosen as one of the ambassadors for LDH Martial Arts' "ENERGY PROJECT" which advertises different fitness supplies from LDH's original brand. In the same month, it was announced she would co-star in the GYAO! web-drama Hapigora! (Happy-Go-Lucky!) alongside her label mates Alan Shirahama and Mandy Sekiguchi, both members of Generations from Exile Tribe.

On September 17, 2019, she announced her second collaboration with EVRIS titled SUDA ANNA×EVRIS Vol.2- "SPECIAL COLLABORATION". The collaboration was intended to commemorate the brand's 6th anniversary, included several products which were designed by Sudanna herself and was released on October 10.

Personal life 
Sudanna is known for her flashy hair colors. In an interview with the online magazine FNMNL she mentioned that after debuting with E-girls and entering the entertainment industry as a teenager, she felt pressured to conform to feminine standards and "look as neat as an actress". However, this made her feel uncomfortable since she had always preferred individuality. In order to break through her shell she started wearing street wear and dyeing her hair in flashy colors. At that time, people around her didn't accept this style, saying she shouldn't have that kind of hair color or that she should "dress more like a girl". Despite the opposition, Sudanna did not quit. For this reason she also wants to encourage young girls to pursue self-expression and not to feel shy about it.

Filmography 
To see her appearances with Happiness, see Happiness (Japanese group), to see her appearances with E-girls, see E-girls

Dramas

TV Shows

Commercials

Music videos

Runways

Bibliography

Catalogues

Magazines

References

External links
 Anna Suda's Profile on Universal Music Japan

1997 births
Living people
Japanese child actresses
Japanese female dancers
Japanese television actresses
Japanese women pop singers
Japanese people of Filipino descent
Singers from Tokyo
LDH (company) artists
21st-century Japanese singers
21st-century Japanese women singers